The Conservation Park Site, also known as the Pine River Park Site and  designated 20GR33, is an archaeological site located along the Pine River in Alma, Michigan.  The site was discovered by archaeologists from Alma College in 1976, and excavations conducted in 1977-81 and 1983-85 found early Woodland period material. indicating a camp covering . The site was listed on the National Register of Historic Places in 1985.

References

Further reading

External links
Pine River Park from the city of Alma

Buildings and structures in Gratiot County, Michigan
Archaeological sites on the National Register of Historic Places in Michigan
National Register of Historic Places in Gratiot County, Michigan